Bradley Sherwood is an American actor, singer, comedian, game show host and writer.

Career
His first acting job was a recurring role on L.A. Law as Ned Barron, which lasted for six episodes from 1991 to 1992.

Sherwood was introduced to improv after being encouraged to attend a comedy class in Los Angeles, and he joined the cast of the syndicated sketch-comedy series The Newz in 1994.

In 1992, Sherwood became a recurring performer for three seasons of the British improvisational comedy television show Whose Line Is It Anyway?. He was the only actor from the Los Angeles auditions to make it to the cast. He then joined the American version of Whose Line Is It Anyway? which originally aired on the American broadcaster ABC. The American version was hosted by comedian Drew Carey. Sherwood later made a guest appearance in three episodes of Carey's sitcom The Drew Carey Show. He was also a producer and performer on Drew Carey's Green Screen Show (2005) and a performer on Drew Carey's Improv-A-Ganza (2011).

In 2013, the American broadcast network The CW revived Whose Line?, on which Sherwood has made occasional appearances.

Sherwood hosted The Dating Game from 1996 to 1997 and The Big Moment in 1999, and was a guest host on Talk Soup. He has also been a regular panelist on To Tell The Truth, Jury Duty, and Hollywood Squares.

He regularly appears on numerous VH-1 series, including I Love The 70s, I Love The 80s, I Love The 90s, 100 One-Hit Wonders of The 80s, 100 Greatest Rock Ballads, I Love Toys, and Greatest Game Show Moments. He was a guest on Larry King Live and a regular panelist on Chelsea Lately.

Other work
In 2003, Sherwood teamed up with fellow Whose Line? performer Colin Mochrie for a two-man improv show titled An Evening With Colin Mochrie and Brad Sherwood. On March 28, 2007, Sherwood and Mochrie performed at the Congressional Radio and Television Correspondents' Association Dinner in Washington, D.C.

In 2010–11, Sherwood was one of a rotating group of guest announcers on American TV show The Price Is Right before George Gray was chosen as the next permanent announcer.

Filmography

Filmography courtesy of IMDb.

References

External links
An Evening with Colin Mochrie & Brad Sherwood official site

Living people
American male comedians
American game show hosts
American male television actors
Wright State University alumni
Male actors from Chicago
Male actors from Santa Fe, New Mexico
Comedians from Illinois
20th-century American comedians
21st-century American comedians
1964 births